The 1985 Lorraine Open was a men's tennis tournament played on indoor carpet courts in Nancy, France, and was part of the 1985 Nabisco Grand Prix. The tournament took place from 18 March through 24 March 1985. First-seeded Tim Wilkison won the singles title.

Prize money

*per team

Finals

Singles
 Tim Wilkison defeated  Slobodan Živojinović 4–6, 7–6, 9–7
 It was Wilkison's 1st singles title of the year and the 6th and last of his career.

Doubles
 Marcel Freeman /  Rodney Harmon defeated  Jaroslav Navrátil /  Jonas Svensson 6–4, 7–6

References

External links
 ITF tournament edition details

Lorraine Open
Lorraine Open
Lorraine Open
Lorraine Open
Carpet court tennis tournaments